Kaz (born Kazimieras Gediminas Prapuolenis; July 31, 1959) is an American cartoonist, animator, writer, storyboard artist, and illustrator. In the 1980s, after attending New York City's School of the Visual Arts, he was a frequent contributor to the comic anthologies RAW and Weirdo. Since 1992, he has drawn Underworld, an adult-themed syndicated comic strip that appears in many alternative weeklies.

Career 
Kaz's comics and drawings have appeared in many alternative and mainstream publications including Details, The New Yorker, Nickelodeon Magazine, The Village Voice, East Village Eye, Swank, RAW, Eclipse, N.Y. Rocker, New York Press, Screw and Bridal Guide. He has continued to contribute to comics anthologies such as Zero Zero.

Kaz has also worked on several animated television shows including SpongeBob SquarePants, Camp Lazlo, and Phineas and Ferb. He was co-executive producer of Get Blake!.

Kaz joined SpongeBob SquarePants as a storyboard director and writer in 2001 during the production of the series' third season. The series went on hiatus after production began on The SpongeBob SquarePants Movie. Shortly before production on the fourth season began in 2004, Kaz was invited by his colleague and the series' newly appointed showrunner, Paul Tibbitt, to work on an episode for the fourth season but he was never contacted by Tibbitt again and joined Camp Lazlo after leaving SpongeBob. After Phineas and Ferb ended production, Kaz returned to SpongeBob in 2015 as a writer.

With Derek Drymon, Kaz co-wrote and storyboarded the pilot episode for Diggs Tailwagger, which was ultimately not picked up. In September 2006, Kaz left Camp Lazlo to work on another pilot for a Cartoon Network show, Zoot Rumpus, based on a character from Underworld. With Mr. Lawrence, he wrote the episode SpongeBob's Big Birthday Blowout and is currently working on the SpongeBob spinoff Kamp Koral.

Kaz will write the screenplay for the Sandy Cheeks spinoff film, Saving Bikini Bottom, which Tom Stern will also write the film with him.

Personal life
Kaz lives in Hollywood, California, with his wife Linda Marotta.

Filmography

Television

Film

Bibliography

References

External links
 
 
 Kaz Prapuolenis: You don’t have to live an intense life, Interviews with exceptional minds, Eximia

1959 births
Living people
American animators
American comic strip cartoonists
American people of Lithuanian descent
The New Yorker cartoonists
Artists from Hoboken, New Jersey
People from Hollywood, Los Angeles
School of Visual Arts alumni
Underground cartoonists
American television writers
American male television writers
American storyboard artists
Primetime Emmy Award winners
Screenwriters from New Jersey
Screenwriters from California